Frank Quill Nebeker (born April 23, 1930) is a senior judge of the United States Court of Appeals for Veterans Claims and a former judge of the District of Columbia Court of Appeals.

Born in Utah, Nebeker received an associate degree in history from Weber College, a bachelor's degree in political science from the University of Utah, and a Juris Doctor from American University. During his law school years, Nebeker worked as a correspondence secretary in the White House.  He began his legal career in 1956 as a trial attorney in the Internal Security Division of the Department of Justice.  Two years later, he became an Assistant United States Attorney for the District of Columbia, serving from 1962 to 1969 as the Chief of the Appellate Division.  His reputation as an appellate counsel led to his appointment in 1969 as an Associate Judge on the District of Columbia Court of Appeals, where he had a reputation as a judicial conservative. He led several of his colleagues in opposition to Chief Judge Theodore R. Newman Jr., the first black chief judge of the court. He retired from the D.C. Court of Appeals in 1987, and served as a senior judge of that court until December 2021.

Nebeker's retirement was short. He served as Director of the Office of Government Ethics, responsible for developing and monitoring the rules which govern the conduct of those in the Executive Branch. When Congress provided for judicial review of veterans benefits decisions and created the U.S. Court of Veterans Appeals (now the U.S. Court of Appeals for Veterans Claims), President George H. W. Bush appointed Nebeker, with the consent of the Senate, to be its first Chief Judge.

In November 2004, he retired from the U.S. Court of Appeals for Veterans Claims and is now serving in recall status. Nebeker has been active for many years in the organization and presentation of education programs for attorneys and appellate judges throughout the country.

References

External links
 Material on this page was adapted from the United States Court of Appeals for Veterans Claims biography of Judge Frank Q. Nebeker, a source in the public domain.
D.C. Court of Appeals bio
Interview with Hon. Frank Nebeker, Oral History Project, Historical Society of the District of Columbia Circuit

1930 births
Living people
Weber State University alumni
University of Utah alumni
American University alumni
Washington College of Law alumni
Judges of the District of Columbia Court of Appeals
Judges of the United States Court of Appeals for Veterans Claims
United States Article I federal judges appointed by George H. W. Bush
20th-century American judges
Assistant United States Attorneys